Lucien Lottenbach (born 4 October 1996 in Adligenswil, Canton of Lucerne, Switzerland) is a Swiss curler.

Teams

Personal life
He started curling in 2006 when he was 12 years old.

References

External links

Living people
1996 births
People from Lucerne-Land District
Swiss male curlers

Sportspeople from the canton of Lucerne